James William Park (14 February 1910 – 9 February 1943) was an Australian rules footballer who played with Carlton in the Victorian Football League (VFL) during the 1930s.

He died in action, in New Guinea, whilst serving with the Second AIF.

Family
Born in Bendigo on 14 February 1910 to Dr. Alexander Park (1868–1929) and Ethel Marion Park (1881–1966), née Reilly, James William Park had three brothers, Alex, George, and Bob, and three sisters, Ethel, Hilda and Jean.

His father, a general practitioner, moved his practice from Bendigo (having originally practised in Tatura) to Moonee Ponds in 1919, in order to facilitate the education of his children: the boys attended Melbourne's Scotch College, which had not yet moved to Hawthorn and was still in East Melbourne, and the girls attended Melbourne's Presbyterian Ladies' College, also in East Melbourne.

He married Marjorie Jean Steele (1913–?) on 26 October 1935, and they had one daughter, Joan Millicent Park (later Mrs Schinner).

Education
He attended Scotch College from 1919 to 1926. He then went on to the Dookie Agricultural College, where he excelled in cricket, swimming, and football, as well as in his academic pursuits. In his second year, he was dux of his class, and in his final year he was second only to the dux. He graduated from Dookie with a Diploma of Agriculture at the end of 1930.

Football
Recruited from Bass Valley Football Club, in Gippsland, he received his clearance to play with Carlton on 27 April 1932, and having played well for the Second XVIII on the preceding Saturday, he made his senior debut for Carlton at centre half-back, against Hawthorn, on 21 May 1932 (round four).

Park played in the back pocket and was a premiership player with Carlton in 1938, restricting prolific Collingwood forward Ron Todd to three goals (two of which came from free kicks).

In the same season, he was chosen to represent Victoria for the first time in his career.

On Saturday, 28 May 1938, at Princes Park, in a match against Melbourne, which, although having more scoring shots, Carlton lost 14.18 (102) to 16.11 (107) — it was Carlton's first loss for the season — Park took one of the greatest marks of all time. Playing in the back pocket, in front of the Melbourne goal (having had only four yards of running space), he soared over the Melbourne forward Eric Glass, completing the mark. In the moment before the picture, Glass stands erect, Park's left heel is at the level of Glass's left shoulder, his left knee is well above Glass's right shoulder, his right leg extended for balance, and the ball is a short distance away.

Military service
With his occupation listed as both "clerk" and "manager", Park enlisted in the Second AIF on 12 March 1941. On Tuesday, 18 March 1941, a senior team training night, Park attended Princes Park as a guest of the Carlton Football Club committee, and he "was presented with a cheque in recognition of his services to the club in the last nine years".

On 9 February 1943, he was killed in action while fighting Japanese forces with the 2/6th Infantry Battalion at the Battle of Wau in New Guinea.

See also
 List of Victorian Football League players who died in active service

Footnotes

References 
 Hobbs, G., "Jim Park", Football Record, (25–28 April 1991), p. 15.
 Main, J. & Allen, D., "Park, Jim", pp. 307–310 in Main, J. & Allen, D., Fallen — The Ultimate Heroes: Footballers Who Never Returned From War, Crown Content, (Melbourne), 2002. 
 Engagements: Marjorie Jean Steele to James William Park, The Argus, (Tuesday, 14 August 1934), p.10.
 Victorians in Army Casualty List: Australia and the Islands: Killed in Action: Park, J.W., The Argus, (Thursday, 25 February 1943), p.4.
 Deaths: On Active Service: Park, The Argus, (Saturday, 6 March 1943), p.2.
 Deaths: On Active Service: Park (inserted on behalf of the committee, players, and staff of the Carlton Football Club), The Age, (Monday, 8 March 1943), p.5.
 Football: CarltonPlayer Killed, The Age, (Monday, 8 March 1943), p.4.
 Carlton Footballer Killed (Obituary), The Argus, (Monday, 8 March 1943), p.3.

External links

 
 
 Blueseum Biography: Jim Park
 Jim Park, Boyles Football Photos.
 Australian War World War II Service Record: James William Park
  Australian War Memorial Roll of Honour: James William Park (VX51193)
 World War II Nominal Roll: James William Park (VX51193)
 Commonwealth War Graves Commission Record: James William Park (VX51193)

1910 births
1943 deaths
People educated at Scotch College, Melbourne
Australian rules footballers from Bendigo
Australian Rules footballers: place kick exponents
Carlton Football Club players
Carlton Football Club Premiership players
Australian Army officers
Australian military personnel killed in World War II
Australian Army personnel of World War II
Deaths by firearm in Papua New Guinea
One-time VFL/AFL Premiership players
Military personnel from Melbourne
Australian rules footballers from Melbourne
People from Moonee Ponds, Victoria